Trichosea androdes is a moth of the family Noctuidae. It is endemic to Sumatra and Peninsular Malaysia.

Pantheinae
Moths described in 1924